Pirmin Schwegler (born 9 March 1987) is a retired Swiss footballer.

Career
Schwegler began his career with FC Luzern. 
In summer 2005, he joined Young Boys. 
After just one year with Young Boys he signed with Bayer Leverkusen. On 18 July 2009, after three years with the "Werksclub", Schwegler signed with Eintracht Frankfurt. Schwegler, wearing the captain's armband for three years at Frankfurt, left the club in the 2014 summer transfer to join fellow Bundesliga side TSG Hoffenheim on a three-year deal.

He signed for Australian club Western Sydney Wanderers, on a one-year deal, for their upcoming 2019–20 season. Schwegler retired from football at the end of the 2019–20 A-League in August 2020.

Personal
He is the brother of Christian Schwegler.

When he was 16-months-old, he was diagnosed with leukaemia.  He was initially only given a 10% chance of survival.  Doctors at the University of Bern Hospital's children's ward, led by Dr. Annette Ridolfi Luthy, fought to save him.  The chemotherapy was successful but Schwegler had to go back to the clinic for regular check-ups throughout his childhood.

References

External links

  
 

1987 births
Living people
Swiss men's footballers
BSC Young Boys players
FC Luzern players
Bayer 04 Leverkusen players
Eintracht Frankfurt players
TSG 1899 Hoffenheim players
Hannover 96 players
Western Sydney Wanderers FC players
Expatriate footballers in Germany
Switzerland youth international footballers
Switzerland under-21 international footballers
Switzerland international footballers
2010 FIFA World Cup players
Place of birth missing (living people)
Swiss Super League players
Bundesliga players
2. Bundesliga players
A-League Men players
Swiss-German people
Association football midfielders
Sportspeople from the canton of Lucerne